Lac Baker is a formerly incorporated Canadian village in Madawaska County, New Brunswick.

It is adjacent to the shore of Lake Baker, which derives its name from that of John Baker, founder of Baker Brook.

History

On 1 January 2023, Lac Baker amalgamated with the rural community of Haut-Madawaska to form the new town of Haut-Madawaska. The community's name remains in official use.

Demographics 

Population trend

Mother tongue (2016)

Notable people

See also
List of communities in New Brunswick

References

External links
 Official website (French)

Communities in Madawaska County, New Brunswick
Former villages in New Brunswick